Sri Vira Parakrama Narendra Singha (Sinhala:ශ්‍රී වීර පරාක්‍රම නරේන්ද්‍රසිංහ; 1707–1739 AD) was the last Sinhalese King of Sri Lanka of the Kingdom of Kandy. He was also known as the "Prince of Kundasale".

Childhood

Narendra Singha was the successor of his father Vimaladharmasurya II. His mother was a Royal Concubine called Muthukude Devi, who was from a local noble family. According to historical sources his father's other wives became jealous of him. So they conspired to kill him and his mother while they sailed across the Mahawali river at Lewella ferry by drawing. But a young man was going nearby saved both of them.

After this incident King Vimaladharmasuriya II kept his beloved son at Kundasale Palace for safety. Because of this he was called as Prince Kundasale.

Prince Kundasale was a playful boy in his young ages.

Ascension to the throne

Prince Kundasale was adopted by his father's Queen Consort to offer him the legal inheritance for the throne. When he was enthroned few members of the Royal Court disagreed and they tried to give the throne to Prince Pattiya Bandara. As the result during his reign, the chiefs and nobles strengthened their authority. Once a conspiracy was planned by the Second Adigar Yalegoda and his follower chiefs of the court against the king and one of the old friends of the king, called Pedro Dascon alias Pirre de Gascogne, pioneered in protecting the king. In return, the king appointed him as the Second Adigar in 1709.

Region

Vira Parakrama Narendra Singha was believed to be a considerably pious monarch, and like his predecessor, he lived at peace with the Dutch invaders and devoted himself to the furtherance of literature and religion.

Marriages

Narendra Singha had several marriages as mentioned in history. His Queen Consort was a princess from the Madurai Nayakkar dynasty. She was known as Pramila Devi, daughter of Lord Pitti Nayakkar and Lady Abhirami Devi. She was known to have had a secret affair with the king's close companion, the Second Adigar Dascon. After it was revealed to the public, Dascon's beheading was ordered by the king

Narendra Singha had a consort called Udumale Devi. Some historians say that it was an honourable name for the Queen Consort.

He married a daughter of Monaravila Disave of Matale and he had two sons with her. One was Prince Unambuwe Bandara and the second son died at a young age.

According to some historical folktales he appointed his maternal female cousin from Muthukude Walawwa as a Royal Concubine.

The King also married a local princess of Palle Walawwa, Kurukohogama named Heen Kumari, but she had committed suicide because she had never wanted to marry him.

Succession

After the death of the king in 1739, the throne was succeeded by his wife's brother, Sri Vijaya Rajasinha, who was of Nayakkar nationality which originated from south India, as he had no brothers or sons from the queen consort. But he had children from his royal consort, such as prince Unambuwe Bandara, upon his death, the law from India which belonged to the Queen consort refused to appoint Unumbuwe Bandara as successors. After that, the throne of the Sinhalese kings ended and was passed on to Madurai Nayakkars till the Sri Lankan monarchy ended.

See also
 Mahavamsa
 List of monarchs of Sri Lanka
 History of Sri Lanka

References

Sources
 Kings & Rulers of Sri Lanka

V
 Sinhalese Buddhist monarchs
1739 deaths
1690 births
Monarchs of Kandy
V
V